The 2007 Scottish Cup Final was played on 26 May 2007 at Hampden Park in Glasgow and was the final of the 121st Scottish Cup. The final was contested by Celtic, who beat St Johnstone 2–1 in the semi-final, and Dunfermline Athletic, who beat Hibernian 1–0 in a replay, after the first match had ended 0–0.

Celtic had reached the final 53 times and won on 34 of those occasions, Dunfermline had reached the final only 5 times, winning twice, the previous time being 1968. The two sides had last met in a Scottish Cup Final in the 2003–04 Scottish Cup with Celtic winning 3–1 on that occasion. In total they had met each other 4 times in cup finals (Celtic winning 3), the most recent being when Celtic won 3–0 in the 2006 League Cup Final.

The cup holders were Hearts, who had beaten Gretna 4–2 in a Penalty shootout in the 2006 Final. Hearts were knocked out in the Fourth Round by Dunfermline Athletic, who beat them 1–0. Celtic won the final 1–0 thanks to a late Jean-Joël Perrier-Doumbé goal.

Match details

Road to the final

References

2007
Cup Final
Scottish Cup Final 2007
Scottish Cup Final 2007
2000s in Glasgow